Safa Women's Football Club, or simply Safa, is a women's association football club based in Wata El-Museitbeh, Beirut, Lebanon, section of the homonymous football club. Founded in 2019, they compete in the Lebanese Women's Football League and have won one league title.

History 

Founded on 14 May 2019, Safa debuted in the 2019–20 season and finished in second place. They won their first league title in the 2020–21 season, after beating ÓBerytus 6–1 in the final matchday of the season. Having won the league, Safa qualified to compete in the 2022 edition of the WAFF Women's Clubs Championship for the first time. They became the first Lebanese team to win the competition, after beating Orthodox of Jordan 3–1 in the final.

Players

Current squad

Honours

Domestic 
 Lebanese Women's Football League
 Winners (1): 2020–21
 Lebanese Women's Super Cup
 Winners (1): 2021–22

Continental 
 WAFF Women's Clubs Championship
 Winners (1; record): 2022

Continental record 
WAFF Women's Clubs Championship: 1 appearance
2022: Champions

See also
 Lebanese Women's Football League
 Women's football in Lebanon
 List of women's association football clubs in Lebanon

References

Safa SC
Women's football clubs in Lebanon
2019 establishments in Lebanon
Association football clubs established in 2019